The Pennsylvania Avenue station was a station on the demolished BMT Fulton Street Line in Brooklyn, New York City. It had 2 tracks and 1 island platform, and was served by trains of the BMT Fulton Street Line. The station was opened on November 18, 1889, one of three other stations to do so. The next stop to the east was Van Siclen Avenue. The next stop to the west was Eastern Parkway, until 1918, when it was replaced by Hinsdale Street. 

On November 28, 1948, the Independent Subway System built the underground Liberty Avenue Subway station two blocks north after years of war-time construction delays. This station rendered the elevated station obsolete, and it closed on April 26, 1956.

References

External links
Pennsylvania Avenue Elevated Station; BMT Fulton Street Elevated (NYCSubway.org)

Defunct BMT Fulton Street Line stations
Railway stations in the United States opened in 1889
Railway stations closed in 1956
Former elevated and subway stations in Brooklyn